Gazipur-3 is a constituency represented in the Jatiya Sangsad (National Parliament) of Bangladesh since 2019 by Iqbal Hossain Sabuj of the Awami League.

Boundaries 
The constituency encompasses Sreepur Upazila and two union parishads of Gazipur Sadar Upazila: Bhawal Gor and Pirujali.

History 
The constituency was created in 1984 from the Dhaka-23 constituency when the former Dhaka District was split into six districts: Manikganj, Munshiganj, Dhaka, Gazipur, Narsingdi, and Narayanganj.

Ahead of the 2008 general election, the Election Commission redrew constituency boundaries to reflect population changes revealed by the 2001 Bangladesh census. The 2008 redistricting added a fifth seat to Gazipur District and altered the boundaries of Gazipur-3.

Members of Parliament

Elections

Elections in the 2010s 
Rahmat Ali was re-elected unopposed in the 2014 general election after opposition parties withdrew their candidacies in a boycott of the election.

Elections in the 2000s

Elections in the 1990s

References

External links
 

Parliamentary constituencies in Bangladesh
Gazipur District